Susan Yelavich is a design scholar, critic, curator and Professor Emerita of Design Studies at Parsons School of Design, The New School, New York City.

Career

Academic
Susan Yelavich was director of the MA Design Studies program at Parsons from 2012 to 2018. She is a member of Scientific Committee for Design at the Polytechnic University of Milan; and has taught frequently in Poland under the auspices of the New School's Transregional Center for Democratic Studies in Wroclaw, the School of Form in Poznan, and the Academy of Fine Arts in Warsaw, with the support of the Adam Mickiewicz Institute.

Curator
Among the exhibitions she curated are: Inside Design Now, the 2003 National Triennial at the Smithsonian's Cooper Hewitt Design Museum, where she worked from 1977 to 2002, as well as the exhibition Deep Surface: Contemporary Ornament and Pattern, which she co-curated with Denise Gonzales Crisp in 2011 at the Contemporary Art Museum of Raleigh, NC.

Awards
In 2018, Susan was awarded a Fellowship at the Bogliasco Foundation in Liguria and in 2003 she was awarded the Rome Prize and became a fellow of the American Academy in Rome. She is the author of numerous articles and books, including Thinking Design through Literature with a foreword by Paola Antonelli (Routledge, 2019); Design as Future-Making co-edited with Barbara Adams (Bloomsbury, 2014); and Contemporary World Interiors (Phaidon, 2007), which discussed over 500 projects and was translated into German, French, and Italian. Her first book, The Edge of the Millennium: An International Critique of Architecture, Urban Planning, Product and Communication Design (Whitney Library of Design, 1993), received a Federal Design Achievement award.

Personal life
She is married to an artist, Michael Casey with whom she had a son, Henry T. Casey, who is also a writer. She lives in New York.

Bibliography

Books written
Yelavich, Susan. Thinking Design through Literature (https://www.routledge.com/Thinking-Design-Through-Literature-1st-Edition/Yelavich/p/book/9781138712560) 
Yelavich, Susan, and Stephen Doyle. Design for Life: The Collections of the National Design Museum. New York, NY: Rizzoli, 1997. 
Yelavich, Susan. Contemporary World Interiors. UK: Phaidon Press, 2009. 
German translation, by Holger Wölfle Innenarchitektur weltweit 	Berlin : Phaidon, 2008 
French translation, by  Laure Bataillou and  Marianne Bouvier, Architecture intérieure du monde contemporain  Paris : Phaidon, DL 2008 
Italian translation, Architettura d'interni contemporanea London; New York: Phaidon, 2008

Books edited
Yelavich, Susan, ed. The Edge of the Millennium: An International Critique of Architecture, Urban Planning, Product and Communication Design. New York, N.Y.: Whitney Library of Design, 1993. 
Yelavich, Susan, and Barbara Adams. eds. Design As Future-Making. London [etc.]: Bloomsbury Academic, 2017. 
Susan Yelavich, ed. Profile: Pentagram Design. London: Phaidon, 2004.

Select chapters and forewords
Kleinman, Kent, Joanna Merwood-Salisbury, and Lois Weinthal, eds. After Taste: Expanded Practice in Interior Design.  New York: Princeton Architectural Press, 2012. . 
“Product(ive) Leisure,” in proceedings of FAIR Design Conference on Design Theory and Criticism,” Academy of Fine Arts Warsaw, 2017 
Griffith Winton, Alexa and Schneiderman, Deborah, eds. Foreword, Textile Technology and Design: From Interior Space to Outer Space, London: Bloomsbury, 2016. .

References

Parsons School of Design faculty
Year of birth missing (living people)
Living people
Academic staff of the Polytechnic University of Milan